= Ano Kotradis =

Town of ancient Cilicia

Coordinates: 36°31′51″N 32°28′17″E

- Interactive map of Ano Kotradis
- Location: Near Ballık, Asiatic Turkey
- Region: Cilicia

History
- Built: Roman period
- Abandoned: Byzantine period

Ano Kotradis was a town of ancient Cilicia, inhabited in Roman and Byzantine times.

Its site is located near Ballık, Asiatic Turkey.
